Coral Sea Park is a  public park in the Eastern Suburbs of Sydney, New South Wales, Australia.

Coral Sea Park is located in the suburb of Maroubra.

Features

Coral Sea Park has a cricket pitch, a basketball court, and several soccer fields and rugby fields. There is also a large playground for children.

Coral Sea Park is an off-leash dog area.

History

Coral Sea Park references the Battle of the Coral Sea of 1942, considered a turning point of World War 2.

Several of the surrounding streets are named after U.S. warships, such as New Orleans Crescent, Yorktown Parade and Astoria Circuit.

References

Parks in Sydney
Maroubra, New South Wales
Australian places named after U.S. places or U.S. history